Pierre-Henri Lecuisinier (born 30 June 1993 in Flers, Orne) is a French cyclist who currently rides for amateur team  UV Aube-Club Champagne Charlott'.

Major results
Sources:

2009
 1st  National Cyclo-cross championships
2010
 1st Bernaudeau Junior
2011
 UCI Junior Road World Championships
1st  Road race
9th Time trial
 UEC European Junior Road Championships
1st  Road race 
5th Time trial
 1st  Overall Trofeo Karlsberg
1st Stages 2 & 3 (ITT)
 8th Overall Grand Prix Rüebliland
1st Stage 3 (ITT)
 9th Paris–Roubaix Juniors
 10th Overall Course de la Paix Juniors
 10th GP Général Patton
2012
 1st  Overall Ronde de l'Isard
1st  Points classification
1st  Youth classification
 9th Liège–Bastogne–Liège U23
2013
 1st  Overall Tour de la Dordogne
1st Stage 3
 1st  Overall Boucles de la Marne
1st Stage 3
 1st Prologue Boucles de la Mayenne
 7th Overall Paris–Arras Tour
 9th Ronde Van Vlaanderen Beloften
 9th Overall UAE Tour
2017
 4th Ronde du Pays Basque
 8th GP Puyloubier
 10th Tour de Basse-Navarre
2020
 9th Grand Prix de la Libération

References

External links

1993 births
Living people
French male cyclists